Denn may refer to:

DENN, the NASDAQ ticker symbol for Denny's
Denn, County Cavan, a parish in County Cavan, Ireland
Denn GFC, a Gaelic Athletic Association club in County Cavan, Ireland

People with the surname
Matthew Denn (born 1966), American lawyer and politician
Robert Denn, English cricketer

See also
Den (disambiguation)
Cavan, Ireland